Chambéry Aerodrome or Chambéry Challes-les-Eaux Aerodrome  is an airport located in Challes-les-Eaux, Savoie, near Chambéry.

References

 {http://www.aerostories.org/~aerobiblio/article4024.html}

Airports in Auvergne-Rhône-Alpes
Buildings and structures in Savoie
Transport in Chambéry